Athis bogota is a moth in the Castniidae family. It is found in Colombia.

References

Moths described in 1912
Castniidae